Pasiansi is an Ward in Ilemela District, Mwanza Region, Tanzania with a postcode 33206. In 2016 the Tanzania National Bureau of Statistics report there were 17,713 people in the ward, from 35,723 in 2012.

References

Wards of Mwanza Region
Ilemela District
Constituencies of Tanzania